{{DISPLAYTITLE:C23H22N2O2}}
The molecular formula C23H22N2O2 may refer to:

 PB-22, a designer drug offered by online vendors as a cannabimimetic agent
 SDB-005, an indazole-based synthetic cannabinoid